"Stamp on the Ground" is a song by German dance group ItaloBrothers. The song was released in Germany as a digital download on September 25, 2009. The song has charted in Denmark, Norway and Sweden.

Music video
A music video to accompany the release of "Stamp on the Ground" was first released onto YouTube on June 14, 2009 at a total length of three minutes and thirty-three seconds. It ranks 3rd on the list of currently available music videos by German artists, having over 115 million views as of December 2020.

Track listing
 Digital download
 "Stamp on the Ground" (Radio Edit) - 3:16
 "Stamp on the Ground" (Caramba Traxx Radio Edit) - 3:45
 "Stamp on the Ground" (Megastylez Radio Edit) - 3:34
 "Stamp on the Ground" (Max Farenthide Radio Edit) - 3:41
 "Stamp on the Ground" (Extended Mix) - 5:04
 "Stamp on the Ground" (Caramba Traxx Remix) - 5:56
 "Stamp on the Ground" (Megastylez Remix) - 5:09
 "Stamp on the Ground" (Max Farenthide Remix) - 6:22

Chart performance

Certifications

Release history

References

2009 singles
ItaloBrothers songs
2009 songs
All Around the World Productions singles
Techno songs
Viral videos
Internet memes introduced in 2009
2009 YouTube videos